The electoral district of Warrenheip was an electorate of the Victorian Legislative Assembly in the British colony, and later Australian state, of Victoria. Created in 1889, the electorate was abolished in 1927 when it became the electoral district of Warrenheip and Grenville.

Members for Warrenheip

Election results

References

Former electoral districts of Victoria (Australia)
1889 establishments in Australia
1927 disestablishments in Australia